William Partlemore Kirk (July 19, 1934 – October 26, 2009) was an American professional baseball player.

Kirk signed a Major League contract with the Philadelphia Athletics in 1954. That year, he registered a 12–9 record with a 3.32 ERA for Class D Welch Miners. Kirk stayed with the Athletics when the team moved to Kansas City in 1955, pitching for six minor league teams before being promoted to the majors late in the 1961 season. While playing for Class-A Lancaster Red Roses, he had pitched a no-hitter at Stumpf Field in July 1960.

Kirk's lone MLB appearance came as a starting pitcher on September 23, 1961, facing the visiting Cleveland Indians at Municipal Stadium. He gave up four earned runs on six hits and a walk, while striking out three in three innings of work, giving up home runs to Chuck Essegian and Johnny Romano.  Kirk did not take the loss (that went to Dave Wickersham in a 9–5 Cleveland triumph), but never appeared in a major league game again.

In 1964, Kirk pitched and coached for Class-A York White Roses. It was his last baseball venture in a career that spanned 11 years.

Following his playing career, Kirk worked as an advertising and marketing executive. Bill Kirk died in Lititz, Pennsylvania, at the age of 75.

References

External links
Baseball Reference
BR minor leagues
Retrosheet
The Deadball Era
Obituary

1934 births
2009 deaths
Albany Senators players
Baseball players from Pennsylvania
Chattanooga Lookouts players
El Paso Texans players
Hot Springs Bathers players
Kansas City Athletics players
Lancaster Red Roses players
Major League Baseball pitchers
Sportspeople from Lancaster, Pennsylvania
People from York County, Pennsylvania
Pocatello Bannocks players
Portland Beavers players
Portsmouth-Norfolk Tides players
Shreveport Sports players
Welch Miners players
York White Roses players
People from Coatesville, Pennsylvania